Clanculus ceylonicus is a species of sea snail, a marine gastropod mollusk in the family Trochidae, the top snails.

Description
The size of the shell varies between 8 mm and 15 mm. The shell shows heavily beaded spiral cords, 11 on the last whorl. Small axial ribs join the beads in between.

Distribution
This marine species occurs in the Indian Ocean off Réunion, India and Sri Lanka.

References

 G. & H. Nevill, 1869, Journal of the Asiatic Society of Bengal p. 157, 1869

External links
 To Biodiversity Heritage Library (1 publication)
 To World Register of Marine Species
 
 Vie Oceane: Clanculus ceylonicus

ceylonicus
Gastropods described in 1869